Ballinderry is a small civil and ecclesiastical parish on both sides of the County Londonderry / County Tyrone border in Northern Ireland. It is a rural parish of about 350 houses and lies on the western shores of Lough Neagh.

The parish contains two small villages: Ballylifford and Derrychrin, which are of relatively close proximity to Cookstown, Coalisland, Magherafelt and Dungannon. They are also very close to the settlements of Ardboe, Moortown, The Loup, and Ballyronan.

Places of interest
The Ballinderry River flows into Lough Neagh at Ballinderry. The river has formed the border between the two counties of Londonderry and Tyrone since the creation of the former. It is regarded by anglers as one of the best trout rivers in Ulster, and is also good for salmon.  One variety of trout, known as dollaghan, is native to the Lough Neagh area. Canoeing is also popular along the river and canoe steps have been built at several points to aid the sport's participants.

Owing to its location on the shores of Lough Neagh, fishing was historically the primary source of income for many local people.

Notable people
Enda Muldoon - All Star Former Derry GAA footballer.
Kevin McGuckin - Former Derry GAA player and vice-captain.
Conleith Gilligan - Former Derry GAA player
James Conway - Former Derry GAA player
 Suspected serial killer John Bodkin Adams lived in Ballinderry from 1903 to 1911. He became a general practitioner and worked in Eastbourne, England, from 1922. He was charged in 1957 with the murder of two patients but was acquitted. He was however, suspected of causing the death of 163 other patients.

Sport

Gaelic games are the most popular sports in the area, with Ballinderry Shamrocks GAC being the local club. Páirc na Seamróg is the team's grounds. Ballinderry GAC is best known for winning the All-Ireland Senior Club Football Championship in 2002. They field Gaelic football teams at U8, U10, U12, U14, U16, Minor, Reserve, Thirds and Senior levels. Ballinderry also fields Camogie teams from U6, U8, U10, U12, U14, U16, U18 and Seniors.
Angling is also popular in the area, judging by the growing membership of "Ballinderry Bridge Angling Club".

Education
 Ballylifford Primary School - Catholic primary school
 Derrychrin Primary School - Catholic primary school

Townlands

Ballinderry consists of 12 townlands. Below is a list of these townlands along with their Irish origin and meaning.

Ardagh
Ballinderry
Ballydonnell
Ballylifford
Ballymultrea
Ballyronan Beg
Belagherty
Killymuck
Lanaglug
The Gort alias Eglish
Mullan Upper
Mullan Lower

See also
List of villages in Northern Ireland

References

 NI Neighbourhood Information System
 Discover Northern Ireland article on Ballinderry River
 Ballinderry GAC Website

External links